There are a number of places named Lakehurst:
Lakehurst, New Jersey
Lakehurst High School, a fictional school in Degrassi: The Next Generation
Lakehurst Mall, a defunct shopping complex in Waukegan, Illinois
Naval Air Engineering Station Lakehurst, the location of the Hindenburg Disaster